Mark Holmes (born October 28, 1964) is a Canadian sprint canoer who competed in the mid-1980s. He finished ninth in the K-4 1000 m event at the 1984 Summer Olympics in Los Angeles.

References
Sports-Reference.com profile

1964 births
Canadian male canoeists
Canoeists at the 1984 Summer Olympics
Living people
Olympic canoeists of Canada
Place of birth missing (living people)
20th-century Canadian people